The Scarlet Pimpernel is a 1934 British adventure film directed by Harold Young and starring Leslie Howard, Merle Oberon, and Raymond Massey. Based on the 1905 play by Baroness Orczy and Montagu Barstow and the classic 1905 adventure novel by Orczy, the film is about an eighteenth-century English aristocrat (Howard) who leads a double life, passing himself off as an effete aristocrat while engaged in a secret effort to rescue French nobles from Robespierre's Reign of Terror. The film was produced by Alexander Korda. Howard's portrayal of the title character is often considered the definitive portrayal of the role. In 1941, he played a similar role in "'Pimpernel' Smith" but this time set in pre-WWII Germany.

Plot

In 1792, shortly before the Reign of Terror, vengeful French mobs are outraged when aristocrats are saved from death by a secret society of 20 English noblemen known as the "Band of the Scarlet Pimpernel." The Scarlet Pimpernel, their mysterious leader, is Sir Percy Blakeney, a wealthy English baronet and friend of the Prince of Wales. Sir Percy cultivates the image of a fop to conceal his identity. Not even his wife Marguerite, a former noted French actress, suspects the truth.

Citizen Chauvelin, the newly appointed French ambassador to England, discovers that Armand St. Just, Marguerite's brother, is one of the Scarlet Pimpernel's agents. Chauvelin orders Armand's arrest and uses the threat of his execution to force Marguerite into helping him discover the identity of the Pimpernel. He has discovered that his quarry will be at a forthcoming ball. At the ball, Marguerite intercepts a message stating that the Pimpernel will be in the library at midnight. She passes the information along to Chauvelin, who goes to the library to find Blakeney, apparently asleep. While waiting, Chauvelin falls asleep; when he wakes up, he finds a message from the Pimpernel mocking him.

The next morning, the Blakeneys travel to their house in the country. Marguerite breaks down and tells her husband of Armand's arrest and her deal with Chauvelin. Sir Percy, though still deeply in love with his wife, had cooled to her because he learned that she had denounced a French marquis, which had led to the executions of the marquis and his family. She reveals that the marquis had had her imprisoned for consorting with his son. After being freed by the French Revolution, she told her friend Chauvelin, who was the one who denounced them. Promising to help, Percy leaves for London. Afterward, Marguerite notices a detail on a portrait of the 1st baronet – a ring decorated with a pimpernel. Realising that she has betrayed her own husband, she rushes out of the room, only to be presented a letter from Chauvelin announcing that he has discovered the Pimpernel's true identity as well. Racing back to London, she warns Ffoulkes that Percy's life is in danger. Ffoulkes mobilises the band to warn Percy.

To lure Percy into his trap, Chauvelin has both Armand and the Count de Tournay transferred to Boulogne-sur-Mer. Despite the vigilance of Chauvelin's men, the Pimpernel frees the two men through bribery. However, one of the prison guards tells Chauvelin that the Pimpernel will be at a certain tavern that evening. Marguerite rushes there to warn Percy, only to be arrested by Chauvelin. Percy arrives at the appointed time and is met by a gloating Chauvelin. Percy distracts him long enough for Armand and the count to board the ship, but when Chauvelin informs him that he has Marguerite in custody, Percy surrenders on the condition that she be freed. He is taken away to be shot by a firing squad. Chauvelin exults at the sound of gunfire, but Percy returns to the tavern very much alive; the soldiers are in fact his men. After securing Chauvelin, Percy and his wife sail away to England.

Cast
 Leslie Howard as Sir Percy Blakeney
 Merle Oberon as Lady Blakeney
 Raymond Massey as Chauvelin
 Nigel Bruce as The Prince of Wales
 Bramwell Fletcher as The Priest
 Anthony Bushell as Sir Andrew Ffoulkes
 Joan Gardner as Suzanne de Tournay
 Walter Rilla as Armand St. Just
 Mabel Terry-Lewis as Countess de Tournay
 O. B. Clarence as Count de Tournay
 Ernest Milton as Robespierre
 Edmund Breon as Colonel Winterbottom
 Melville Cooper as Romney 
 Gibb McLaughlin as The Barber 
 Morland Graham as Treadle (credited as Moreland Graham)
 John Turnbull as Jellyband 
 Gertrude Musgrove as Jellyband's daughter "Sally"
 Allan Jeayes as Lord Grenville
 A. Bromley Davenport as French Innkeeper (Brogard) (as Bromley Davenport)
 William Freshman as Lord Hastings
 Hindle Edgar as Lord Wilmot
 Derrick de Marney as Member of the League (uncredited)
 Robert Rietti as Boy (uncredited)
 Philip Strange as Member of the League (uncredited)

Production
Alexander Korda, a Hungarian who had been born in a town not far from Baroness Orczy's farm, had recently had great success with the actor Charles Laughton in the film The Private Life of Henry VIII, so he asked Laughton to play the role of Sir Percy. When the announcement went out to the press, the reaction from the Pimpernel's many fans was negative; the pug-nosed Laughton was thought a poor choice to play the suave Sir Percy. Korda thus gave the role to Leslie Howard.

Reception
Andre Sennwald wrote in The New York Times that "'The Scarlet Pimpernel' is stirring to the pulse and beautiful to the eye, and it weaves the richly textured background of those tingling months of the French Revolution into an enormously satisfying photoplay. ... Did the narrative seem a trifle leisurely in places? No matter. It was a leisurely age and here is a succulent and captivating entertainment." He also praised Leslie Howard's performance.

The Scarlet Pimpernel was the sixth most popular film at the British box office during 1935–36.

References

External links 
 
 
 
 
 

1934 films
1930s adventure drama films
Films set in 1792
Cultural depictions of George IV
British adventure drama films
British black-and-white films
London Films films
Scarlet Pimpernel films
Films directed by Harold Young (director)
Films based on French novels
Films produced by Alexander Korda
United Artists films
Films based on works by Emma Orczy
Cultural depictions of Maximilien Robespierre
1934 drama films
Films shot at Imperial Studios, Elstree
1930s British films